Soublette is a surname, a variant of Sublette. Notable people with this surname include:

Carlos Soublette (1789 – 1870), former President of Venezuela
Juan Gabriel Valdés Soublette (born 1947), Chilean scientist, diplomat and former minister
Isaac José Pardo Soublette (1905 – 2000), Venezuelan intellectual, politician, journalist, and essayist
Sylvia Soublette (1924-2020) Chilean composer

See also
La Soublette, a neighborhood of  Catia La Mar, Venezuela